Rubus uvidus is a North American species of brambles in the rose family. It grows in the province of Québec in eastern Canada, as well as in the northeastern and north-central United States (New York, Michigan, Pennsylvania, Ohio, and Wisconsin).

The genetics of Rubus is extremely complex, so that it is difficult to decide on which groups should be recognized as species. There are many rare species with limited ranges such as this. Further study is suggested to clarify the taxonomy.

References

uvidus
Plants described in 1943
Flora of Quebec
Flora of the United States
Flora without expected TNC conservation status